Father is a 2011 French thriller film directed by Pasquale Squitieri. It stars Franco Nero, Andrea Fachinetti, Daniel Baldock and Claudia Cardinale. It was screened at the Bari International Film Festival.

References

External links

2011 films
Films directed by Pasquale Squitieri
French thriller films
2011 thriller films
2010s English-language films
2010s French films